Ingrid Stairs is a Canadian astronomer currently based at the University of British Columbia. She studies pulsars and their companions as a way to study binary pulsar evolution, pulsar instrumentation and polarimetry, and Fast Radio Bursts (FRBs). She was awarded the 2017 Rutherford Memorial Medal for physics of the Royal Society of Canada, and was elected as a Fellow of the American Physical Society in 2018.

Education 
Stairs obtained her undergraduate Honors degree from McGill University in 1993, and obtained Masters and PhD degrees from Princeton University in 1995 and 1998 respectively.  For her PhD research she worked with Professor Joe Taylor.

Career 
From 1998 to 2000, Stairs was a postdoctoral fellow at the Jodrell Bank Observatory in the United Kingdom. From 2000 to 2002 she was a research associate at NRAO in Green Bank, West Virginia. In 2002 she became an assistant professor at the University of British Columbia where she has been ever since, becoming an associate professor in 2007 and a full professor in 2012.

Research 
Stairs works on various topics related to the science of extreme gravitational objects. She uses large scale pulsar searches with both the Arecibo Telescope and Green Bank Telescope to study pulsar populations and their evolution, find new millisecond pulsars and exotic binary systems. She has helped assembled coherent dedispersion instruments for Arecibo and Green Bank. She times millisecond pulsars as a member of the NANOGrav experiment.

In addition to finding these pulsars, she uses long term pulsar timing to study the orbital dynamics of pulsar systems, such as and interaction between the two stars in the system. She has extensively studied relativistic binary systems like B1534+12, J1906+0746, and the double pulsar J0737-3039A/B. She also tracks some young pulsars, such as J1740-3502, which has a massive binary companion, and  PSR 1828-11 which undergoes correlated timing and magnetospheric changes.

Stairs is part of the CHIME FRB and pulsar collaborations. CHIME is currently operational and has released many new FRB candidates including new repeating FRB candidates. Stairs was responsible for managing the installation of the CHIME pulsar instrument.

Honours and awards 
2018 American Physical Society Fellow
2017 Royal Society of Canada Rutherford Memorial Medal in Physics
 2017 Canadian Astronomical Society Peter G. Martin award for Mid-career Achievement
 2014 Senior Fellow, CIFAR Cosmology & Gravity/Gravity & Extreme Universe programs
 2010-2013 NSERC Discovery Accelerator Supplement
 2002-2007 NSERC University Faculty Award
 2000-2002 Jansky Research Associateship, NRAO
 1998-2000 NSERC Postdoctoral Fellowship
 1993-1997 NSERC 1967 Scholarship
 1993 Joseph Henry Award, Princeton University

References

External links 

University website
Research website
Royal society award

Living people
Year of birth missing (living people)
21st-century Canadian astronomers
University of British Columbia people
Women astronomers
Fellows of the American Physical Society